Georges Chakra is a Beirut-based Lebanese haute couture fashion designer. Georges Chakra first established his brand in 1985, and he has displayed his cultural collections at Paris Fashion Week since the mid-1990s.


Biography 
Georges Chakra began his career in interior design. After two years of initial study, he moved to Canada to finish his schooling at the Canadian Fashion Academy. In 1985, at 22 years old, he returned to his home country Lebanon and opened his first store.

He had a small but dedicated clientele base for a number of years until his work was featured in the 2006 film The Devil Wears Prada, 20 years into his career. This helped his line grow into an international haute couture fashion house, having dressed Rihanna, Beyoncé, Tyra Banks, Jennifer Lopez, and Helen Mirren.

Chakra had featured in major fashion magazines InStyle, Harper's Bazaar, Vanity Fair, Elle, Madame Figaro, Gala and Genlux.

TV and film
Aside from his creations appearing in the 2006 movie The Devil Wears Prada, featuring Meryl Streep, Georges Chakra's work has also been featured in the television series Gossip Girl featuring Blake Lively and Leighton Meester.

Notable clients
 Gwen Stefani
 Hiba Tawaji - Cannes Film Festival 2017
 Goldie Hawn
 Barbara Meier
 Catherine-Zeta Jones
 Rebecca Rominj
 Sophie Marceau
 Dakota Fanning
 Julia Louis-Dreyfus
 Juliette Lewis
 Kristen Bell
 Hilary Duff
 Jane Fonda
 Kelly Osborne
 Sheryl Crow
 Queen Latifah

References

External links

Kellyrowland.com
Official Chakra page
Georges Chakra collections since 2006 (arabic version)
Lebanon Weddings
Lebanon Weddings guide

Year of birth missing (living people)
Living people
Artists from Beirut
Lebanese fashion designers